Sardaryab is a tourist and picnic spot near Peshawar in Khyber Pakhtunkhwa, Pakistan.

It is a popular site for tourists, famous for fresh fish eating and boat riding.

References 

https://sardaryab.ga
Charsadda District, Pakistan